A fee is the price one pays as remuneration for rights or services.

Fee or fée may also refer to:

Land tenure 
 Fee (feudal tenure), or fief, fiefdom
 Fee simple, a form of estate in land in common law
 Fee tail, a tenure of an entailed estate in land
 Knight's fee, a fief large enough to support a knight

People with the name
 Fee (surname), a surname of Irish origin
 Fei (surname) (simplified Chinese: 费; traditional Chinese: 費), also transliterated "Fee"
 Antoine Laurent Apollinaire Fée (1789–1874), French botanist
 Fee Malten (1911–2005), German actress
 Fee Waybill (born 1950), American musician
Fee Recording Artist

Places 
 F. E. Everett Turnpike (acronym FEE), a toll road in the U.S. state of New Hampshire
 Fee Glacier, in the Swiss Alps
 Mount Fee, in British Columbia, Canada

Arts, entertainment, and media 
 Fee (band), a Christian rock/worship band
 "Fee Fi Fo", a song by Irish rock band The Cranberries
 Fee Fi Fo Yum, a British children's television game show presented by Les Dennis
 "Fee-fi-fo-fum", a line from the English fairy tale "Jack and the Beanstalk"
  (The Fairy), a 2011 French-Belgian film

Organizations 
 Faculty of Electrical Engineering, Czech Technical University in Prague, CTU in Prague
 Faculty of Electronic Engineering, Menoufia University, in Egypt
 Fédération des Eclaireuses et Eclaireurs, a French scouting and guiding federation
 Forest Enterprise England
 Foundation for Economic Education, an American libertarian think tank
 Foundation for Environmental Education, an international environmental organization
 Free Education for Everyone, an Irish student campaign group

Other uses 
 Failure of exchange entitlements; see Theories of famines
 Fee de Marbourg, a breed of rabbit
 FEE method, in numerical analysis
 Front-end engineering
 La Fée Absinthe, a brand of absinthe

See also 
 Fe (disambiguation)